The year 2000 is the sixth year in the history of Fighting Network Rings, a mixed martial arts promotion based in Japan. In 2000 Fighting Network Rings held 18 events beginning with, Rings Holland: There Can Only Be One Champion.

Title fights

Events list

Rings Holland: There Can Only Be One Champion

Rings Holland: There Can Only Be One Champion was an event held on February 6, 2000 at The Vechtsebanen Sport Hall in Utrecht, Netherlands.

Results

Rings: King of Kings 1999 Final

Rings: King of Kings 1999 Final was an event held on February 26, 2000 at The Nippon Budokan in Tokyo, Japan.

Results

Rings Australia: NR 4

Rings Australia: NR 4 was an event held on March 19, 2000 at The Alexandra Hills Hotel in Brisbane, Australia.

Results

Rings: Millennium Combine 1

Rings: Millennium Combine 1 was an event held on April 20, 2000 at The Yoyogi National Stadium Gym 2 in Tokyo, Japan.

Results

Rings Russia: Russia vs. The World

Rings Russia: Russia vs. The World was an event held on May 20, 2000 at The Yekaterinburg Sports Palace in Yekaterinburg, Sverdlovsk Oblast, Russia.

Results

Rings Russia: Russia vs. Bulgaria

Rings Russia: Russia vs. Bulgaria was an event held on May 21, 2000 in Tula, Russia. This card featured the MMA debut of future Pride Heavyweight Champion and MMA superstar, Fedor Emelianenko.

Results

Rings Holland: Di Capo Di Tutti Capi

Rings Holland: Di Capo Di Tutti Capi was an event held on June 4, 2000 at The Vechtsebanen Sport Hall in Utrecht, Netherlands.

Results

Rings: Millennium Combine 2

Rings: Millennium Combine 2 was an event held on June 15, 2000 at The Yoyogi National Stadium Gym 2 in Tokyo, Japan.

Results

Rings USA: Rising Stars Block A

Rings USA: Rising Stars Block A was an event held on July 15, 2000 at The McKay-Dee Hospital Center in Orem, Utah.

Results

Rings USA: Rising Stars Block B

Rings USA: Rising Stars Block B was an event held on July 22, 2000 at The Neal S. Blaisdell Center in Honolulu, Hawaii.

Results

Rings: Russia vs. Georgia

Rings: Russia vs. Georgia was an event held on August 16, 2000 at The Tula Circus in Tula, Russia.

Results

Rings: Millennium Combine 3

Rings: Millennium Combine 3 was an event held on August 23, 2000 at The Osaka Prefectural Gymnasium in Osaka, Japan.

Results

Rings: Battle Genesis Vol. 6

Rings: Battle Genesis Vol. 6 was an event held on September 5, 2000 at Korakuen Hall in Tokyo, Japan.

Results

Rings USA: Rising Stars Final

Rings USA: Rising Stars Final was an event held on September 30, 2000 at The Mark of the Quad Cities in Moline, Illinois.

Results

Rings: King of Kings 2000 Block A

Rings: King of Kings 2000 Block A was an event held on October 9, 2000 at The Yoyogi National Stadium Gym 2 in Tokyo, Japan.

Results

Rings Lithuania: Bushido Rings 1

Rings Lithuania: Bushido Rings 1 was an event held on October 24, 2000 at The Vilnius Palace of Concerts and Sports in Vilnius, Lithuania.

Results

Rings Australia: Free Fight Battle

Rings Australia: Free Fight Battle was an event held on November 12, 2000 at The Alexandra Hills Hotel in Brisbane, Australia.

Results

Rings: King of Kings 2000 Block B

Rings: King of Kings 2000 Block B was an event held on December 22, 2000 at The Osaka Prefecture Gymnasium in Osaka, Japan.

Results

See also 
 Fighting Network Rings
 List of Fighting Network Rings events

References

Fighting Network Rings events
2000 in mixed martial arts